= Ankum, Virginia =

Unincorporated community in Virginia, United States

Coordinates: 36°36′13″N 77°52′51″W

Ankum is an unincorporated community located in Brunswick County, in the U.S. state of Virginia.
